California City is a city located in northern Antelope Valley in Kern County, California, United States. Covering , California City has the third-largest land area of any city in the state of California, and is the largest city by land area in California that is not a county seat.

Other major sources of employment include California City Correctional Center (California Department of Corrections and Rehabilitation); Mojave Air and Space Port and its flight test operations; and the Hyundai/Kia Proving Grounds located in the rural southwestern part of the city. California City has a park, a PGA golf course, and a municipal airport.

History

Early 
Padre Francisco Garcés, a Franciscan missionary, camped at Castle Butte in what is now California City in 1776 during the Juan Bautista de Anza expedition of Alta California.

In the late 19th century, the Twenty-Mule Team Trail, which carried loads of borax to the railhead in Mojave from Harmony Borax Works mines in the east, ran through the California City area.

Military
The Mojave Gunnery Range "C" was used from August 1944 until January 1959, when it became part of the California City land. It included bomb targets and strafing targets such as a vehicle convoy. It was also used for pilotless aircraft just after World War II.

Site surveys beginning in 1999 found MK 23 3-pound practice bombs with unfired signal cartridges, 20-millimeter Target Practice projectiles, 2.25, 2.75, and 5-inch practice rockets, high explosive bombs, and small arms ammunition from .22 to .50 caliber were found. The largest fuzed and unexploded bombs found were two 100-pound general purpose bombs.

Town 

In 1958, Czech-born Columbia University sociology professor and real estate developer Nathan "Nat" K. Mendelsohn purchased  of Mojave Desert land with the aim of making California's next great city. California City Development Company (CCDC) was aggressively marketing the city by running a "real estate school" to license and train a large salesforce, and a quarter-page Los Angeles Times advertorial described it as a "giant venture" and "inevitable growth".

Mendelsohn hoped it would one day rival Los Angeles in population, and CCDC had the Smith and Williams architects master plan the community in 1961; Garrett Eckbo also contributed. Mendelsohn built a Central Park with a  artificial lake. Two golf courses and a four-story Holiday Inn were built next to the park. Ultimately the actions of CCDC caused the town to become known for land speculation through CCDC and successors. Mendelsohn was advertising the city for land speculation by 1962; 175 homes had been built by then. The city has a rich history of promotion, including hiring Erik Estrada to advocate for the city; in the 2000s land was sold through infomercials.

The Italian-American civil engineer Olindo R. Angelillo surveyed the city's aquifer on behalf of CCDC in 1959, stating it was on top of a "virtual underground lake" of 1 million acre-feet of water per year. This was quickly rebutted by the chief of a US Geological Survey office, a hydraulic engineer at the state's water department and California's Association of Engineering Geologists.

The first post office opened in 1960.

California City was incorporated on December 10, 1965, partly to shift municipal infrastructure responsibility to the city, rather than CCDC. It was described as having  of land, 5,900 landowners, 817 residents, and 232 homes.

Growth fell well short of his expectations and by the time Mendelsohn sold his shares in CCDC in 1969 to Great Western United Corporation, only 1,300 people had moved in; CCDC was described as having a 1,300-person salesforce at that time, with ads for "real estate salesmen" describing it as "A whole new successful way of selling California real estate!!!"

The Federal Trade Commission also began inspecting the company in 1969, and Ralph Nader's 25-person California task force (part of "Nader's Raiders") published "Power and Land in California" in late 1971. The book accused various individuals and agencies of ineptitude and corruption, as well as focusing on California City, calling it a fraud and "a particularly stark study of government failure." By that time Mendelsohn had sold over $100 million in land.

By the 1970s over 50,000 lots had been sold and the market dried up. The FTC filed a cease and desist against the company for misleading advertising, with a consent order coming in 1972 from FTC's Richard Lavine. Charges (which White effectively agreed with in 1971) included the real estate school was primarily geared towards selling land, not providing training; enrollees were required to bring in land prospects; the property was encumbered, not fee simple, advertised improvements (e.g. roads) did not exist; it failed to meet the Truth in Lending Act.  In 1974 The New York Times described Great Western City Corporation as "the troubled land development subsidiary" of Great Western United. After taking CCDC to court, the Federal Trade Commission's Ken Donney reached a settlement in 1977, with over 14,000 landowners receiving partial refunds from a $4 million pool, the largest FTC settlement to date. CCDC was also required to invest $16 million in long-promised infrastructure developments at CCDC's three cities.

Although areas of California City have not developed as expected, California City has grown from 3,200 people in 1985 to over 14,000 in 2018, clustered around the west end.

Geography
Although one of California's smaller cities in terms of population, California City is the third largest city in California by land area. Satellite photos underscore its claim to being California's third-largest city by land area (40th largest in the United States).

Geology

The Garlock Fault runs nearby.

Climate

Demographics

2000
According to the census of 2000, there were 8,385 people in 3,067 households, including 2,257 families, in the city. , the city's population grew 8.9% from 12,106 to 13,219. California City outpaced rivals Palmdale and Lancaster, making the city the 12th fastest growing city in California. This also made California City the fastest growing city in the Antelope Valley. The racial makeup of the city was 68.19% White, 12.82% Black or African American, 1.56% Native American, 3.73% Asian, 0.32% Pacific Islander, 7.43% from other races, and 5.94% from two or more races.  16.96% of the population were Hispanic or Latino of any race.

Of the 3,067 households, 39.0% had children under the age of 18 living with them, 55.8% were married couples living together, 13.0% had a female householder with no husband present, and 26.4% were non-families. 21.2% of households were one person and 7.2% were one person aged 65 or older. The average household size was 2.72 and the average family size was 3.15.

The age distribution was 30.7% under the age of 18, 7.3% from 18 to 24, 27.7% from 25 to 44, 23.5% from 45 to 64, and 10.7% 65 or older. The median age was 36 years. For every 100 females, there were 99.5 males. For every 100 females age 18 and over, there were 99.0 males.

The median income for a household in the city was $45,735, and the median family income was $51,402. Males had a median income of $44,657 versus $28,152 for females. The per capita income for the city was $19,902. About 12.5% of families and 17.3% of the population were below the poverty line, including 28.0% of those under age 18 and 12.4% of those age 65 or over.

31% of the male population were public administrators in 2006. Public administration is the most common job in California City.

Although the growth of the city has not met its founders' expectations, California City has seen substantial population growth over the past several years. The Demographic Research Unit of the California Department of Finance estimated California City's population at 12,048 as of January 1, 2006. California City's population increased an estimated 4.2% in 2005, over three times the growth rate of the state as a whole. California City currently ranks 345th out of 478 incorporated cities in California, up from 348th in 2005.

In the 2004 Presidential election, 66% voted for the Republican candidate, and 32% voted for the Democratic candidate. In 2016 the vote for president was 53% Republican and 40% Democratic.

2010
At the 2010 census California City had a population of 14,120. The racial makeup of California City was 9,188 (65.1%) White (39.9% were non-Hispanic whites), 2,150 (15.2%) African American, 132 (0.9%) Native American, 367 (2.6%) Asian, 59 (0.4%) Pacific Islander, 1,431 (10.1%) from other races, and 793 (5.6%) from two or more races. Hispanic or Latino of any race were 5,385 persons (38.1%).

The census reported that 11,506 people (81.5% of the population) lived in households, no one lived in non-institutionalized group quarters and 2,614 (18.5%) were institutionalized.

There were 4,102 households, 1,611 (39.3%) had children under the age of 18 living in them, 1,980 (48.3%) were opposite-sex married couples living together, 630 (15.4%) had a female householder with no husband present, 287 (7.0%) had a male householder with no wife present. There were 335 (8.2%) unmarried opposite-sex partnerships, and 22 (0.5%) same-sex married couples or partnerships. 949 households (23.1%) were one person and 312 (7.6%) had someone living alone who was 65 or older. The average household size was 2.80.  There were 2,897 families (70.6% of households); the average family size was 3.30.

The age distribution was 3,449 people (24.4%) under the age of 18, 1,294 people (9.2%) aged 18 to 24, 4,617 people (32.7%) aged 25 to 44, 3,570 people (25.3%) aged 45 to 64, and 1,190 people (8.4%) who were 65 or older.  The median age was 34.8 years. For every 100 females, there were 144.0 males. For every 100 females age 18 and over, there were 160.1 males.

There were 5,210 housing units at an average density of 25.6 per square mile, of the occupied units 2,474 (60.3%) were owner-occupied and 1,628 (39.7%) were rented. The homeowner vacancy rate was 8.3%; the rental vacancy rate was 22.5%.  6,584 people (46.6% of the population) lived in owner-occupied housing units and 4,922 people (34.9%) lived in rental housing units.

Infrastructure

Schools
Mojave Unified School District serves California City:
 California City Jr/Sr High
 California City Middle
 Hacienda Elementary school
 Robert P. Ulrich Elementary School (1966)

Private prison
Studies for a privately built and owned 2000-4000-bed prison on the east side of town began in 1995, and an environmental impact statement on a 550-bed facility was completed in 1996. Contracts were signed between the city and Corrections Corporation of America and it was built in 1999. The 2304-bed California City Correctional Facility prison housed federal inmates for the U.S. Marshal Service and U.S. Immigration and Customs Enforcement from 2006 to 2013, then was leased to the California Department of Corrections and Rehabilitation in 2013 for $28.5 million yearly in response to a federal order to reduce overcrowding at the state's prison facilities.

Transportation
California City is served by Highway 14 to the west and Highway 58 to the south. Kern Transit provides direct bus service to Mojave, Lancaster, and Ridgecrest with connections to Tehachapi and Bakersfield. The direct line to Lancaster also provides a direct connection with Metrolink's Antelope Valley Line, with service into Los Angeles. Within the city, California City Dial-A-Ride (DAR) Transit provides transportation on a demand-response basis on weekdays (except on holidays when City Hall is closed).

Business
The  Hyundai-Kia proving grounds are in the city boundaries.  are in use.

Public safety
As an incorporated city that does not contract with Kern County, California City has its own police and fire departments.

Sports
The California City Whiptails were a professional baseball team competing in the unaffiliated Pecos League.  The team folded in 2019. Their home games were played at Balsitis Park.

References

External links

 
Cities in the Mojave Desert
Cities in Kern County, California
Populated places established in 1958
Incorporated cities and towns in California
1958 establishments in California
Planned cities in the United States